The 2021–22 Russian Football National League was the 30th season of Russia's second-tier football league since the dissolution of the Soviet Union. The season began on 10 July 2021, and had a 3 month winter break between game weeks 25 and 26 (December to March).

Stadia by capacity

Team changes

To FNL
 Promoted from PFL
 Kuban Krasnodar
 Olimp-Dolgoprudny
 Metallurg Lipetsk
 KAMAZ

 Relegated from Premier League
 Rotor Volgograd

From FNL
 Relegated to PFL
 Irtysh Omsk
 Dynamo Bryansk
 Chertanovo Moscow
 Shinnik Yaroslavl

 Demoted to lower divisions
 Chayka Peschanokopskoye

 Promoted to Premier League
 Krylia Sovetov
 Nizhny Novgorod

Stadia by locations

League table

Results

Season statistics

Top goalscorers

References

2021–22 in Russian football leagues
Russian First League seasons
Russian